Asian New Zealanders are New Zealanders of Asian ancestry (including naturalised New Zealanders who are immigrants from specific regions in Asia and descendants of such immigrants).
At the 2013 census, 471,708 New Zealanders declared that they had an Asian ancestral background. This represents about 12% of all responses.

Terminology 
Under Statistics New Zealand classification, the term refers to a pan-ethnic group that includes diverse populations who have ancestral origins in East Asia (e.g. Chinese, Korean, Japanese), Southeast Asia (e.g. Filipin, Vietnamese, Malaysian), and South Asia (e.g. Nepalese, Indian (incl. Indo-Fijians), Sri Lankan, Bangladeshi, Pakistani). Notably, New Zealanders of West Asian and Central Asian ancestry are excluded from this term.

Colloquial usage of Asian in New Zealand excludes Indians and other peoples of South Asian descent. Asian as used by Statistics New Zealand includes South Asian ethnic group.

The first Asians in New Zealand were Chinese workers who migrated to New Zealand to work in the gold mines in the 1860s. The modern period of Asian immigration began in the 1970s when New Zealand relaxed its restrictive policies to attract migrants from Asia.

Demographics

There were 718,995 people identifying as being part of the Asian ethnic group at the 2018 New Zealand census, making up 15.3% of New Zealand's population. This is an increase of 235,890 people (50.0%) since the 2013 census, and an increase of 353,046 people (99.6%) since the 2006 census. Some of the increase between the 2013 and 2018 census was due to Statistics New Zealand adding ethnicity data from other sources (previous censuses, administrative data, and imputation) to the 2018 census data to reduce the number of non-responses.

There were 348,948 males and 358,650 females, giving a sex ratio of 0.973 males per female. The median was 31.3 years, compared to 37.4 years for all New Zealanders; 143,691 people (20.3%) were aged under 15 years, 188,235 (26.6%) were 15 to 29, 330,210 (46.7%) were 30 to 64, and 45,462 (6.4%) were 65 or older.

At the 2018 census, 23.0% of the Asian ethnic group was born in New Zealand, up from 22.7% at the 2013 census and 20.0% at the 2006 census. Of those born in New Zealand, 64.6% were under the age of 15.

Most Asian New Zealanders live in the Auckland Region. In terms of population distribution, 62.6% of Asian people live in the Auckland region, 23.9% live in the North Island outside the Auckland region, and 13.8% live in the South Island. The Puketāpaka local board area of Auckland has the highest concentration of Asian people at 49.1%, followed by the Howick local board area (46.5%) and the Whau local board area (40.3%). Hamilton City has the highest concentration of Asian people outside Auckland at 18.5%. The Chatham Islands had the lowest concentration of Asian people at 0.9%, followed by Great Barrier Island (1.6%) and the Rangitīkei District (2.1%).

Chinese, Indian, Filipino, Korean are the most commonly nominated Asian ancestries in New Zealand.  Chinese New Zealanders were 4 percent of the New Zealand population (2013) and Indian New Zealanders were 3 percent of the New Zealand population (2013).

Between the 2001 and 2013 censuses, the proportion of the New Zealand population born in Asia almost doubled in size from 6.6% in 2001 to 11.8% in 2013. Some cities have seen a sharper increase in Asian born population, such as Auckland where 23% of all residents were Asian in 2013.

Social and political issues

Immigration 
The political party New Zealand First has frequently criticised immigration on economic, social and cultural grounds. New Zealand First leader Winston Peters has on several occasions characterised the rate of Asian immigration into New Zealand as too high; in 2004, he stated: "We are being dragged into the status of an Asian colony and it is time that New Zealanders were placed first in their own country." On 26 April 2005, he said: "Māori will be disturbed to know that in 17 years' time they will be outnumbered by Asians in New Zealand", an estimate disputed by Statistics New Zealand, the government's statistics bureau. Peters quickly responded that Statistics New Zealand had underestimated the growth-rate of the Asian community in the past.

In April 2008, deputy New Zealand First party leader Peter Brown drew widespread attention after voicing similar views and expressing concern at the increase in New Zealand's ethnic Asian population: "We are going to flood this country with Asian people with no idea what we are going to do with them when they come here." "The matter is serious. If we continue this open door policy there is real danger we will be inundated with people who have no intention of integrating into our society. The greater the number, the greater the risk. They will form their own mini-societies to the detriment of integration and that will lead to division, friction and resentment."

Race-based discrimination and violence 
Asians, specifically Chinese New Zealanders and others of East Asian origin, were repeatedly met with discrimination during the COVID-19 pandemic. Chinese New Zealander MP Raymond Huo said there were racial abuse incidents in the country's Chinese community. An online petition to bar people from China from entering the country was signed by more than 18,000 people, most of whom had ostensible contempt for Chinese people in general. In Rolleston, Canterbury, an email was sent to a Chinese-origin student's parent, which reportedly said, "our Kiwi kids don't want to be in the same class with your disgusting virus spreaders." Mayor of Auckland Phil Goff said he was "sickened" by the reports of Asian-origin people being racially targeted at swimming pools, public transport and restaurants.

See also

 List of ethnic origins of New Zealanders

Asians in other countries

 Asian Americans
 Asian Argentines
 Asian Australians
 Asian Canadians
 Asian Brazilians
 Asian Peruvians
 Asian South Africans
 Asian French
 Asian people
 British Asian
 East Asians in the United Kingdom

References

External links
Stats NZ site